DXGN (89.9 FM), broadcasting as 89.9 Spirit FM, is a radio station owned and operated by the Davao Verbum Dei Media Foundation, the media arm of the Roman Catholic Archdiocese of Davao. Its studios are located at the San Pablo Parish Church Compound, Juna Subdivision, Matina, Davao City, and its transmitter is located at Shrine Hills, Matina, Davao City.

The station returned to the airwaves on June 12, 2016, after 5 years of hiatus.

References

Radio stations in Davao City
Radio stations established in 1988
Catholic radio stations